A pentacle  is an amulet used in magical evocation, generally made of parchment, paper or metal (although it can be of other materials), on which the symbol of a spirit or energy being evoked is drawn.

Pentacle may also refer to:

Suit of pentacles, a tarot card suit in the Minor Arcana
Pentacle (magazine), a Neopagan magazine
The Pentacle, a short-lived DC Comics supervillain team

See also
Pentagram, a five-pointed star, sometimes referred to as "pentacle"
Pentangle, a British folk-rock band, named for the five-pointed star